KHKC-FM 102.1 FM is a radio station licensed to Atoka, Oklahoma.  The station broadcasts a country music format and is owned by Keystone Broadcasting Corporation.

The station building in Atoka housing both KHKC-FM and KZIG-FM was destroyed by a tornado on May 9, 2016. A new building in another location housing both stations reopened exactly one year later.

References

External links
KHKC-FM's official website

HKC-FM
Country radio stations in the United States